As of the 2022 FIFA World Cup, 80 national teams have competed at the finals of the FIFA World Cup. Brazil is the only team to have appeared in all 22 tournaments to date, with Germany having participated in 20, Italy and Argentina in 18 and Mexico in 17. Eight nations have won the tournament. The inaugural winners in 1930 were Uruguay; the current champions are Argentina. The most successful nation is Brazil, which has won the cup on five occasions. Five teams have appeared in FIFA World Cup finals without winning, while twelve more have appeared in the semi-finals.

List of tournaments

Overall team records
The system used in the World Cup up to 1990 was 2 points for a win. In this ranking 3 points are awarded for a win, 1 for a draw and 0 for a loss. As per statistical convention in football, matches decided in extra time are counted as wins and losses, while matches decided by penalty shoot-outs are counted as draws. Teams are ranked by total points, then by goal difference, then by goals scored.

 Breakdown of successor team records

Finals records by team

Teams statistics
Note: In case there are teams with equal quantities, they will be mentioned in chronological order of tournament history (the teams that attained the quantity first, are listed first). If the quantity was attained by more than one team in the same tournament, the teams will be listed alphabetically.

For a detailed list of top four appearances, see FIFA World Cup results.

Most titles
 – 5 (1958, 1962, 1970, 1994, 2002)

Most finishes in the top two
/West Germany – 8 (1954, 1966, 1974, 1982, 1986 and 1990 as West Germany, 2002 and 2014 as Germany)

Most second-place finishes
/West Germany – 4 (1966, 1982, 1986 as West Germany, 2002 as Germany)

Most World Cup appearances
 – 22 (every tournament)

Most consecutive championships
 – 2 (1934–1938)
 – 2 (1958–1962)

Most consecutive finishes in the top two
 – 3 (1982–1990)
 – 3 (1994–2002)

Longest gap between successive titles
 – 44 years (nine editions, 1938–1982)

Longest gap between successive appearances in the top two
 – 48 years (10 editions, 1930–1978)

Longest gap between successive appearances at the FIFA World Cup
 – 64 years (16 editions, 1958–2022)

Worst finish by defending champions
Did not participate –  (1934)
Group stage –  (1950)
Group stage –  (1966)
Group stage –  (2002)
Group stage –  (2010)
Group stage –  (2014)
Group stage –  (2018)

Players

Most appearances

Players in bold text are still active with their national team as of the 2022 FIFA World Cup.

Most championships

Pelé – 3 (1958, 1962 and 1970)

Most appearances in a World Cup final
Cafu – 3 (1994, 1998, 2002)

Youngest player

Youngest player in a final

Oldest player

Oldest player in a final

Goalscoring

Individual

Top goalscorers

Players in bold text are still active with their national team as of the 2022 FIFA World Cup.

Most goals scored in a single tournament
Just Fontaine – 13 (1958)

Most goals scored in a match

Most goals scored in a final match

Most goals scored in final matches (overall)
Kylian Mbappé – 4 (2018, 2022)

Most consecutive matches scored in
Just Fontaine – 6 (1958)
Jairzinho – 6 (1970)

Most tournaments scored in
Cristiano Ronaldo – 5 (2006, 2010, 2014, 2018, 2022)

Milestone goals

Olympic goals

Youngest goalscorer

Youngest goalscorer in a final

Oldest goalscorer

Oldest goalscorer in a final

Fastest goal

Fastest goal in a final

Latest goal in regular time

Team

Biggest wins

Biggest win in a final

Highest scoring matches

Most goals in a tournament
 – 27 (1954)

Top scoring teams by tournament

Teams listed in bold won the tournament. Fewer than half of all World Cup tournaments have been won by the highest-scoring team.

Tournament

Most goals scored in a tournament
2022 – 172 goals

Fewest goals scored in a tournament
1930 – 70 goals
1934 – 70 goals

Most goals per match in a tournament
1954 – 5.38 goals per match

Fewest goals per match in a tournament
1990 – 2.21 goals per match

Own goals

Assists
Note: FIFA formally records assists only from the 1966 edition onwards.

Most assists
Pelé – 10 (1958–1970)

Most assists in a tournament
Pelé – 6 (1970)
Robert Gadocha – 5 (1974)
Pierre Littbarski – 5 (1982)
Diego Maradona – 5 (1986)
Thomas Hassler – 5 (1994)

Most assists provided in a match

Most assists provided in final matches
Pelé – 3 (1 in 1958, 2 in 1970)

Penalty shoot-outs

Goalkeeping

Most clean sheets
Peter Shilton – 10 (1982–1990)
Fabien Barthez – 10 (1998–2006)

Most consecutive minutes without conceding a goal
Walter Zenga – 517 mins, 5 consecutive clean sheets (1990)

Most goals conceded
Antonio Carbajal – 25 (1950–1966)
Mohamed Al-Deayea – 25 (1994–2006)

Most goals conceded in one tournament
Hong Deok-young – 16 (1954)

Fewest goals conceded in one tournament
Pascal Zuberbühler – 0 (2006)

Fewest goals conceded in one tournament for the eventual winners
Fabien Barthez – 2 (1998)
Gianluigi Buffon – 2 (2006)
Iker Casillas – 2 (2010)

Most saves in one match

Most penalties saved (excluding penalty shoot-outs)
Jan Tomaszewski – 2 (both in 1974)
Brad Friedel – 2 (both in 2002)
Iker Casillas – 2 (2002, 2010)
Wojciech Szczęsny – 2 (both in 2022)

Most penalties saved in one penalty shoot-out

Most penalties saved overall in penalty shoot-outs
Harald Schumacher – 4 (1982–1986)
Sergio Goycochea – 4 (1990)
Danijel Subašić – 4 (2018)
Dominik Livaković – 4 (2022)

Coaching

Most matches coached
Helmut Schön – 25 (1966–1978)

Most matches won
Helmut Schön – 16 (1966–1978)

Most tournaments won
Vittorio Pozzo – 2 (1934–1938)

Most tournaments as a coach
Carlos Alberto Parreira – 6 (1982, 1990–1998, 2006, 2010)

Most different nations coached

Most consecutive tournaments as a coach
Bora Milutinović – 5 (1986–2002)

Most consecutive tournaments as a coach with the same team
Walter Winterbottom – 4 (1950–1962)
Helmut Schön (1966–1978)

Youngest coach
Juan José Tramutola –  (1930)

Youngest coach of a World Cup winning team
Alberto Suppici –  (1930)

Oldest coach
Otto Rehhagel –  (2010)

Oldest coach of a World Cup winning team
Vicente del Bosque –  (2010)

Refereeing

Most tournaments
 John Langenus – 3 (Belgium, 1930–1938)
 Ivan Eklind – 3 (Sweden, 1934–1950)
 Sandy Griffiths – 3 (Wales, 1950–1958)
 Arthur Edward Ellis – 3 (England, 1950–1958)
 Juan Gardeazábal – 3 (Spain, 1958–1966)
 Erik Fredriksson – 3 (Sweden, 1982–1990)
 Jamal Al Sharif – 3 (Syria, 1986–1994)
 Joël Quiniou – 3 (France, 1986–1994)
 Ali Bujsaim – 3 (United Arab Emirates, 1994–2002)
 Óscar Ruiz – 3 (Colombia, 2002–2010)
 Carlos Eugênio Simon – 3 (Brazil, 2002–2010)
 Marco Antonio Rodríguez – 3 (Mexico, 2006–2014)
 Joel Aguilar – 3 (El Salvador, 2010–2018)
 Ravshan Irmatov (Uzbekistan, 2010–2018)
 Alireza Faghani – 3 (Iran, 2014–2022)
 Bakary Gassama – 3 (Gambia, 2014–2022)

Most matches refereed, overall
 Ravshan Irmatov – 11 (Uzbekistan, 2010–2018)

Youngest referee
 Juan Gardeazábal – 24 years and 193 days (Spain, 1958)

Oldest referee
 George Reader – 53 years and 236 days (England, 1950)

Discipline
Note: There are no official records for cautions issued in tournaments before the introduction of yellow cards in 1970.

Fastest caution

Fastest sending off

Fastest sending off, qualification

Latest caution

Latest sending off

Sent off from the bench

Most cards (all-time, player)
 Javier Mascherano – 7 (2006–2018)

Most cautions (all-time, player)
 Javier Mascherano – 7 (2006–2018)

Most sendings off (all-time, player)
 Rigobert Song – 2 (1994 and 1998)
 Zinedine Zidane – 2 (1998 and 2006)

Most sendings off (tournament)
 2006 – 28 (in 64 games)

Most sendings off (all-time, team)
  – 11 (in 97 games)

Most sendings off (match, both teams)

Most sendings off (final match)

Most cautions (tournament)
 2006 – 345 (in 64 matches)

Most cautions (all-time, team)
  – 88 (in 64 games until 2006)

Most cautions (match, one team)
  – 10 (2022, vs. )

Most cautions (match, both teams)

Most cautions (match, player)

Most cautions (final match, both teams)

Most suspensions (tournament, player)
 André Kana-Biyik – 2 (1990)

Teams: Matches played/goals scored

All time

Most matches played
  – 114

Most wins
  – 76

Most losses
  – 28

Most draws
  – 22

Most goals scored
  – 237

Most goalscorers
  – 82

Most goals conceded
  – 130

Fewest goals scored
  – 0
  – 0
  – 0
  – 0

In one tournament

Most goals scored
  – 27 (1954)

Fewest goals conceded
  – 0 (2006)

Most goals conceded
  – 16 (1954)

Most matches gone into extra time
  – 3 (1986)
  – 3 (1990)
  – 3 (2014)
  – 3 (2018)

Most minutes without conceding a goal
  – 517 mins (1990)

Highest goal difference
  – +17 (1954)

Highest goal difference, champions
  – +14 (2002)
  – +14 (2014)

Lowest goal difference
  – −16 (1954)

Lowest goal difference, champions
  – +6 (1938 and 1982)
  – +6 (2010)

Highest average of goals scored per match
  – 5.40 (1954)

Highest average goal difference per match
  – +3.2 (1954)

Most goals scored, champions
  – 25 (1954)

Fewest goals scored, champions
  – 8 (2010)

Fewest goals scored, finalists
  – 5 (1990)

Fewest goals conceded, champions
  – 2 (1998)
  – 2 (2006)
  – 2 (2010)

Most goals conceded, champions
  – 14 (1954)

Lowest average of goals scored per match, champions
  – 1.14 (2010)

Most penalties scored (excluding shoot-outs)
  – 4 (1966)
  – 4 (1978)
  – 4 (2022)

Most penalties awarded (excluding shoot-outs)
  – 5 (2022)

Hat-tricks

Attendance

Highest attendance

Lowest attendance
 vs.  – 300 (14 July 1930, Estadio Pocitos, Montevideo)

Highest average of attendance
1994 – 69,174 per match

Highest aggregated attendance
1994 – 3,594,042

Lowest average of attendance
1934 – 21,239

Lowest aggregated attendance
1934 – 358,000

See also
 AFC Asian Cup records and statistics
 Africa Cup of Nations records and statistics
 CONCACAF Gold Cup records and statistics
 Copa América records and statistics
 FIFA Arab Cup records and statistics
 FIFA Beach Soccer World Cup records and statistics
 FIFA Confederations Cup records and statistics
 FIFA Futsal World Cup
 FIFA U-17 World Cup records and statistics
 FIFA U-20 World Cup records and statistics
 FIFA Women's World Cup records and statistics
 Men's Olympic football tournament records and statistics
 OFC Nations Cup records and statistics
 UEFA European Championship records and statistics
 Women's Olympic football tournament records and statistics

Footnotes

References

External links
 
 

FIFA World Cup records and statistics

All-time football league tables
Records
Top sports lists